Básti is a Hungarian surname. Notable people with the surname include:

István Básti (born 1944), Hungarian football player
Lajos Básti (1911–1977), Hungarian actor
Juli Básti (born 1957), Hungarian actress

See also
Basti (name)

Hungarian-language surnames